Yasin Sadiq (born June 1968) is a Chinese politician of Uyghur origin who has been the secretary-general of Xinjiang Uygur Autonomous Region People's Government since 27 May 2021. He previously served as mayor of Ürümqi, the capital of Xinjiang, from 2018 to 2021. He is a delegate to the 13th National People's Congress.

Biography
Yasin Sadiq was born in Hami, Xinjiang, in June 1968. In 1988, he enrolled in Northwest Minzu University, majoring in Chinese language and literature, where he graduated in 1992. He joined the Chinese Communist Party (CCP) in July 1993.

He served in various posts in Hami before serving as vice mayor in August 2008. In October 2016, he was assigned to Kashgar Prefecture as deputy party secretary and secretary of its Commission for Discipline Inspection, the party's agency in charge of anti-corruption efforts. In November 2017, he became deputy party secretary and vice mayor of Ürümqi, a major city and the capital of Xinjiang, rising to mayor in January 2018. In 27 May 2021, he took office as secretary-general of Xinjiang Uygur Autonomous Region People's Government, replacing .

References

1968 births
Living people
People from Hami
Uyghur politicians
Northwest University for Nationalities alumni
Central Party School of the Chinese Communist Party alumni
Mayors of Ürümqi
People's Republic of China politicians from Xinjiang
Chinese Communist Party politicians from Xinjiang
Delegates to the 13th National People's Congress